Diaphus splendidus, the horned lanternfish, is a species of lanternfish found worldwide.

Size

References

Myctophidae
Taxa named by August Brauer
Fish described in 1904